Adventures of Alan Ladd was a nine-issue series of comic books published by DC Comics from 1949 to 1951. The stories featured the film actor Alan Ladd in a variety of adventurous situations. The first six issues feature photos of the actor on their covers.

See also
 The Adventures of Bob Hope
 The Adventures of Dean Martin and Jerry Lewis

References

External links
Adventures of Alan Ladd at Mike's Amazing World of DC Comics

DC Comics titles
1949 establishments in the United States
1949 comics debuts
1951 disestablishments in the United States
1951 comics endings